This page describes the qualification procedure for the 2008 U.S. Open Cup.  This will be the first season where 8 teams from each level of the American Soccer Pyramid will compete in the tournament proper.  As a result, each level will trim its ranks to its 8 team delegation before entering the full tournament.

Major League Soccer (MLS)

United Soccer Leagues (USL)

USL 1st Division (USL-1)
All American-based USL-1 teams qualify.

USL 2nd Division (USL-2)

Harrisburg City Islanders (2007 USL-2 champions) and Richmond Kickers (2007 USL-2 Regular Season Champions) have qualified based on their end of season performance in 2007.

Early season USL-2 games doubled as Open Cup qualification.  Because teams played an uneven number of games the percentage of "Points per Points Possible" was used to rank the teams.  All but the bottom-ranked team qualified for the tournament proper.

Green indicates Open Cup berth clinched
  

Standings as of May 26.

USL Premier Development League (PDL)
Each conference has its own qualification process.

All teams play 4 designated regular season games that double as Open Cup qualification
Green indicates Open Cup berth clinched

Central Conference
Top two teams qualify

*maximum goal differential of +/- 3 per game
Standings as of May 26.

Eastern Conference
Top two teams qualify

*maximum goal differential of +/- 3 per game
Standings as of May 26.

Southern Conference
Top team in each division qualifies

Mid South Division

*maximum goal differential of +/- 3 per game
Standings as of May 26.

Southeast Division

*maximum goal differential of +/- 3 per game
Standings as of May 26.

Western Conference
Top team in each division qualifies

Northwest Division

*maximum goal differential of +/- 3 per game
Standings as of May 26.

Southwest Division

*maximum goal differential of +/- 3 per game
Standings as of May 26.

United States Adult Soccer Association (USASA)

Region I

Region II

Region III
Group winners qualify
All times in Eastern Daylight Time

Group stage
Green indicates Open Cup berth clinched

Group A

Group B

Group Stage Matches

Final match

Region IV
Group winners qualify
All times in Eastern Daylight Time

Group stage
Green indicates Open Cup berth clinched

Group A

Group B

Group Stage Matches

Final match

See also
 2008 U.S. Open Cup
 United States Soccer Federation
 Lamar Hunt U.S. Open Cup
 Major League Soccer
 United Soccer Leagues
 USASA
 National Premier Soccer League

Qual